Heather Gordon Teokotai (born 14 May 1990) is a male track and field sprint athlete who competes internationally for the Cook Islands.

Teokotai represented the Cook Islands at the 2008 Summer Olympics in Beijing. He competed at the 100 metres sprint and placed 8th in his heat without advancing to the second round. He ran the distance in a personal best time of 11.41 seconds.

References

External links
 

1990 births
Living people
Athletes (track and field) at the 2008 Summer Olympics
Cook Island male sprinters
Olympic athletes of the Cook Islands